Sergio Sarra (Pescara 1961) is an Italian artist and former basketball player.

In 1985, at the age of 24, he retired from playing competitively in order to study at the School of Painting at the Academy of Fine Arts in Bologna, concluding in 1987. Sarra took part in the Biennial of Young Artists from Mediterranean Europe (Barcelona – 1987), Venice Biennale at the Corderie dell'Arsenale (1993) in Aperto '93, at the Italian Pavilion (2011) and in the Havana Biennial (2000). Sarra curated the group exhibition Conversione di Saulo at Palazzo Chigi Odescalchi (Rome – 2000) and exhibited at the Muzeul Naţional de Artă Contemporană (Bucharest – 2007) and the WAX Winkler Art Xperience (Budapest – 2007) in Altered States – Are you experienced?, group exhibition curated by Nicolas Bourriaud and Paolo Falcone, and at Baths of Diocletian (Rome – 2008) at Cose mai viste curated by Achille Bonito Oliva. In 2019, Sarra exhibited at 4th Festival del Paesaggio in Anacapri.

Other group exhibitions at: Palazzo Rondanini alla Rotonda (Rome – 1989), Palazzo della Permanente (Milan – 1991) and Espace Pierre Cardin (Paris – 1992), 34 Spoleto Festival of 2Worlds (Fonti del Clitunno – 1991), Fondazione Orestiadi (Gibellina – 1992), Palazzo delle Esposizioni (Rome – 1992, 1995), Fondazione Volume! (Rome – 2000).

Sarra has held solo exhibitions at public and private institutions including the Faculty of Architecture of University of Palermo (1998), the Micromuseum for Contemporary Art and Culture (Palermo – 2004), Circolo Filologico Milanese (Milan – 2008), the Conservatory of Santa Cecilia (Rome – 2013), the Ewha Womans University (Seoul – 2016), the Benedictine Abbey of Propezzano (Morro d'Oro – 2018), Mattatoio Museo d'Arte Contemporanea (Rome - 2019).

From the beginning of his artistic career, Sarra worked almost exclusively with painting, drawing and sculpture. In 1997, the art critic and curator Lorenzo Benedetti wrote:

Life and work 

He played for the national youth teams, making his debut at sixteen in the Italian Series A basketball championship with the Fortitudo Bologna team.

Upon completing his studies at the Accademia di Belle Arti di Bologna (1987), Sarra then moved to Rome where he held his first solo exhibition at the Galleria Alice in 1990, presenting an installation consisting of four painted sheets of glass and crossed by white light from industrial neon tubes. Such works – being glass – on which Sarra drew symbolic and enigmatic figures, went on to become a constant in his work. In this sense, two solo exhibitions – Trinacria dream (Oporto – 2007) and un ambiente, sei vetri (Rome – 2013) – appear indicative. In occasion of the exhibition in Portugal, art critic Miguel Amado wrote:

Over the next few years, he produced a series of paintings on emulsified canvas – Primitive – comprising zoomorphic figures that were almost always mirror images. The artist was invited to take part in the Aperto '93 Emergency/Emergenza - 45 Venice Biennale, where he created an environment consisting of a long wooden platform in chipboard with three paintings on the walls featuring: Iguane, Paesaggio and Autoritratto. Clarity and essentiality become the dominant factors in his work.

In the paintings after 1997, the artist poses with his 'sign-drawing', being continuous and abstract, various elements – faces, zoomorphic groups, buildings with unknown geometries – that insist upon previous pictorial composition processes that are not entirely erased to reveal further combinatorial forms. In Une correspondance sur les fantômes avec Sergio Sarra between Sarra e Nicolas Bourriaud in May 2007, the French critic and theorist wrote:

In 2000, in Rome, his works were exhibited at the Fondazione Volume!. In the same year, Sarra curated at Palazzo Chigi Odescalchi the group exhibition Conversione di Saulo that was developed around the painting of the same name, painted in 1600 by Caravaggio. Also in 2000, Sarra married Elisabetta Ruscitti in Amalfi, with whom he lived for a short time in Naples. In 2001, their son Gerolamo Papik Merlino was born. It was in Naples that he produced Table Sculpture (table projection on 12 points), a table/sculpture with a huge red Komodo dragon hooked underneath.

Over the same period, he produced the performance Life drawing no. 2, representing the connection between the manual creation and collective fruition in which Sarra coerces the public's perceptive nature, using a strobe light to produce a decisive intermittence between darkness and light. This is the same direction in which Sarra heads when painting 'from real life' inside the WAX Kultúrgyár in Budapest and the Muzeul Naţional de Artă Contemporană in Bucharest for the exhibition Altered States – Are you Experienced? (2006–2007). Between 2006 and 2009, Sarra worked on a series of paintings entitled Psichedelyc garden, in which he reiterates the same design, altering the chromatic impact each time.

In 2011, Sarra published perché la spiaggia si assottiglia dopo le Nàiadi, a book in which he collates a series of drawings and writings focused on the city of Pescara. In 2012, he designed Handrail for Cubist Films, inspired by Fernand Léger's 1924 film Ballet Mécanique, and the diptych Involuntary Commitment, which was exhibited at Galleria Cesare Manzo in Rome and at Fuori Uso 2012 in Pescara.

In June 2016, Sarra was invited to exhibit at the Ewha Womans University in Seoul, where he presented a series of drawings and paintings entitled iceberg rosaspina, accompanied by a short text written by the artist:

Traces of the theoretical processes underlying his works can be found in the short film My Painting Technique (2009, 2015).

Critical review

Selected exhibitions 
 1987 Gabriele Lamberti – Alessandro Pessoli – Sergio Sarra, Galleria del Circolo Artistico di Bologna
 1987 3 Biennial of Young Artists from Mediterranean Europe, Barcelona
 1988  Musée des Augustins, Toulouse
 1989 Palazzo Rondanini alla Rotonda, Rome
 1990 Sergio Sarra, Galleria Alice, Rome
 1991 Sergio Sarra, Galleria Lattuada, Milan
 1991 34 Spoleto Festival of 2Worlds, Fonti del Clitunno, Perugia
 1991 Volpaia in vista, Cantina Caparsino, Radda in Chianti, Siena
 1991 – 1993 Palazzo della Permanente, Milan – former Convento di Santa Maria sopra Minerva, Rome – Espace Pierre Cardin, Paris – National Academy of Design, New York City – U.C.L.A., Los Angeles
 1992 Sergio Sarra, Galleria Cecilia Nesbitt Federici, Rome
 1992 Palazzo delle Esposizioni, Rome
 1992 Fondazione Orestiadi, Gibellina, Trapani
 1993 Aperto '93, Corderie dell'Arsenale, 45 Venice Biennale
 1993 – 1994 Galleria Il Segno, Rome – Galleria Eva Menzio, Turin
 1994 Sergio Sarra, Gentili arte contemporanea, Florence
 1995 Palazzo delle Esposizioni, Rome
 1996 poesie di Anna Cascella - opere di Sergio Sarra Ettore Spalletti, Palazzo Coen e Pieroni, Pescara
 1996 Fuori Uso 1996, former F.E.A., Pescara
 1997 Sergio Sarra, Galleria Cesare Manzo, Pescara. The exhibition was introduced by the performance by Emilio Prini Emilio Prini performavit
 1997 Stadio della Vittoria, Bari
 1997 Segno Senso Suono Sacro: installazioni di Mario Airò – Federico Fusi – Sergio Sarra, Zerynthia Associazione per l'Arte Contemporanea, Serre di Rapolano, Siena
 1997 Opera Paese Associazione Artistica, Rome
 1997 Cava Oliviera, Serre di Rapolano, Siena
 1998 Sergio Sarra, former Chiesa di San Nicola, Carpineto Romano, Rome
 1998 Sergio Sarra, Faculty of Architecture of University of Palermo, Palermo
 2000 Bruna Esposito – Sergio Sarra – Richard Van Buren, Fondazione Volume!, Rome
 2000 Palazzo Chigi Odescalchi, Rome
 2000 Teatro Nacional de Cuba, Galeria René Portocarrero, 7 Havana Biennial, Havana
 2003 Fuori Uso 2003, former Ferrotel, Pescara
 2004 Sergio Sarra, Micromuseum for Contemporary Art and Culture, Palermo
 2006 Fuori Uso 2006, former COFA, Pescara 
 2007 WAX Winkler Art Xperience, Budapest
 2007 Muzeul Naţional de Artă Contemporană (MNAC), Galeria Nouă, Bucharest
 2007 Sergio Sarra, MCO arte contemporânea, Oporto
 2008 Sergio Sarra, Circolo Filologico Milanese, Milan
 2008 Baths of Diocletian, Rome
 2011 Michelangelo Pistoletto – Sergio Sarra – Bob & Roberta Smith, Galleria Cesare Manzo, Rome
 2011 Padiglione Italia, Tese delle Vergini, 54 Venice Biennale
 2013 Sergio Sarra, Conservatory of Santa Cecilia, Rome
 2014 Sergio Sarra, inner room, Siena
 2015 Sergio Sarra, ESAD, Córdoba
 2016 Sergio Sarra, EWHA Womans University, Seoul
 2016 Margherita Morgantin – Sergio Sarra – Italo Zuffi: Ricettivo Nouveau, Garage Carcani, Rome
 2018 Bruna Esposito – Sergio Sarra, Idill'Io arte contemporanea, Recanati, Macerata
 2018 Sergio Sarra, Abbey of Propezzano, Morro d'Oro, Teramo
 2019 Sergio Sarra, Mattatoio Museo di Arte Contemporanea, Rome
2019 4 Festival del Paesaggio, Casa Rossa, Anacapri, Naples
2019 Monitor Gallery, Rome
2021 VIVERE DI PAESAGGIO, apalazzo gallery, Brescia
2021 141. Un secolo di disegno in Italia, Fondazione del Monte di Bologna e Ravenna, Palazzo Paltroni, Bologna
2021 Things Seen : Marco Eusepi, Sergio Sarra, Spaziomensa, Rome

Main readings 
 

Bonito Oliva, Achille (1990). "L'arte fino al 2000 di Achille Bonito Oliva". In Argan, Giulio Carlo (ed.). L'Arte Moderna di Giulio Carlo Argan, volume attached to Corriere della Sera of 28 November 1990, Vol. 11. Milan: RCS Editoriale Quotidiani SpA. 

 

 
 D'Avossa Antonio (1993). "Vedute sul Mondo Reale". In Achille Bonito Oliva (curated by), "Punti cardinali dell'arte", catalog of the 45th International Exhibition of Art in Venice, Vol. I, Venice, Marsilio Editori S.P.A., 1993, OCLC, OPAC IT\ICCU\RAV\0225285.
 D'Avossa, Antonio (1993). "La risposta, amico mio, sta soffiando nel vento – Lettera aperta a Pep Agut, Bigert & Bergström, Marco Brandizzi, Giorgio Cattani, Maria Eichhorn, Marcelo Expósito, Carsten Höller, Kirsten Mosher, Luca Quartana, Sergio Sarra e SubREAL". In Bonito Oliva, Achille; Kontova, Helena; Daney, Serge; et al. (eds.). Aperto '93: Emergency/Emergenza: Flash Art International, exhibition catalogue. Milan: Giancarlo Politi Editore. . OCLC 832241900. OPAC IT\ICCU\LO1\0323441.
 Caruso, Rossella; et al. (1993). "ateleta". In Bonito Oliva, Achille; Kontova, Helena; Daney, Serge (eds.). Aperto '93: Emergency/Emergenza: Flash Art International, exhibition catalogue. Milan: Giancarlo Politi Editore. . OCLC. OPAC IT\ICCU\LO1\0323441.
 

 

 Sarra, Sergio (2000). "Conversione di Saulo", exhibition catalogue. Pescara: Edizioni Arte Nova. OCLC. OPAC IT\ICCU\TO0\0918995.
 

 Curi, Umberto (2007). "Testo dedicato all'opera "Ipotesi di Biblioteca di Chimica dell'Università di Padova (LSD)" di Sergio Sarra". Special Project. In Bourriaud, Nicolas; Falcone, Paolo. Altered States – Are you experienced?, exhibition catalogue. Pescara: Edizioni Arte Nova. OCLC. OPAC IT\ICCU\URB\0638550.
 

 

 Marsala, Helga (2008). "Noisy Writings. Sergio Sarra's Aesthetics of Void". In Sergio Sarra : pearl fishermen, exhibition catalogue. Milan: Circolo Filologico Milanese. OCLC. OPAC IT\ICCU\RMS\2754024.
 Piccoli, Cloe (2011). "Town drawings". In Sergio Sarra, perché la spiaggia si assottiglia dopo le Nàiadi. Silvi (Teramo): Edizione Sarra Varano. . OCLC. OPAC IT\ICCU\TER\0036016.
Curi, Umberto, La Pescara di Sergio Sarra, 13 December 2011.
 
Sarra, Sergio (2016). "Icebergs". In Sergio Sarra : excluding the things I chose to do, exhibition catalogue. Rome: Edizioni di Comunità. . OCLC 1124656885. OPAC IT\ICCU\BVE\0813805.
 Cherubini, Laura (2018). "INFINITY. Bruna Esposito & Sergio Sarra in Recanati". In Bruna Esposito Sergio Sarra, exhibition catalogue. Recanati (Macerata): Idill'Io arte contemporanea. OCLC. OPAC IT\ICCU\BVE\0803903.
 

 D'Orazio, Giorgio (2018). "I Say to You". In Sarra, Sergio (ed.). Dico a te, exhibition catalogue. Morro d'Oro (Teramo): Abbey of Propezzano. OCLC 1105931902.1103488942. OPAC IT\ICCU\BVE\0803753.
 Pietroiusti, Cesare Maria (2019). untitled. In Sergio Sarra : excluding the things I chose to do, exhibition catalogue. Rome: Edizioni di Comunità. . OCLC 1124656885. OPAC IT\ICCU\BVE\0813805.
 Cherubini, Laura (2019). "Sergio Sarra. At the drawing board". In Sergio Sarra : excluding the things I chose to do, exhibition catalogue. Rome: Edizioni di Comunità. . OCLC, OPAC IT\ICCU\BVE\0813805.
Benassi, Giuliana (2019). "The art-life study". In Camerlengo, Simone (ed.). OPENWORK : a focus on painting, exhibition catalogue.
Sarra, Sergio (2020). Sergio Sarra twenty six figures painted on board.  Bologna: Fondazione del Monte di Bologna e Ravenna, 2020, OPAC IT\ICCU\RMS\2968431.
Bruni, Lorenzo. "Things Seen", Critique of the exhibition, 2021.
Legrenzi, Susanna, "L'artista Sergio Sarra: «Ho pensato lo studio come un'installazione. Più che in armonia, in contrasto con il paesaggio»". In Living, Vol. 10, pp. 200-209, volume attached to Corriere della Sera of 6 October 2021, Vol. 237.

References

External links 

 
 

 

 

 

1961 births
Living people
Italian artists
Italian contemporary artists
Academic staff of the Accademia di Belle Arti di Bologna
Academic staff of the Accademia di Belle Arti di Roma
Italian basketball players